Kyle Norman Fawcett  (born 1979 or 1980) is a Canadian politician and former Member of the Legislative Assembly of Alberta, representing the constituency of Calgary-Klein as a Progressive Conservative.

Early life

Fawcett earned his Bachelor of Arts from the University of Calgary in 2002, with a focus on political science and economics. Prior to his election as a member of the Legislative Assembly of Alberta, Fawcett worked as a research consultant in support of both private industry and non-profit initiatives and served as a public school board trustee with the Calgary Board of Education.

Political career

Fawcett first sought public office in 2004 for the position of public school board trustee with the Calgary Board of Education (CBE) for wards 5 and 10. At that time, he was the youngest individual to hold public office in Alberta. While serving as trustee, Fawcett held the positions of chair for both the audit and policy committees, board liaison to the CBE/Alberta Teachers' Association (ATA) liaison committee, and board representative for the ATA collective agreement interpretation committee. He first sought the position of MLA in the 2008 provincial election in the constituency of Calgary-North Hill. In that election, Fawcett received 38% of the vote.

In 2009, Fawcett was a member of the "Fiscal Four," a group of four MLAs dedicated to championing lower deficits, less red tape and increased program reviews.

His work as an MLA included Bill 203, the Municipal Governance (Franchise & Local Access Fee) Amendment Act 2010, Bill 207, the Young Albertans' Advisory Council Act; Motion 507 on Social Innovation and Entrepreneurship, Motion 509 on Urban Infrastructure Planning Organization, and Motion 519 on Non-renewable Resource Revenue and Savings.

On April 23, 2012 Fawcett was re-elected with 41% of the popular vote in the renamed constituency of Calgary-Klein, and was subsequently appointed Associate Minister of Finance & Vice Chair of Treasury Board by then-Premier Alison Redford.  Prior to that Fawcett had served as Parliamentary Assistant to Treasury Board & Enterprise and Chair of the Cabinet Policy Committee on the Economy.

From June 23, 2013 to May 26, 2014, Fawcett served as Associate Minister of Recovery & Reconstruction for SW Alberta, having been appointed by Premier Redford in response to the June 2013 southern Alberta floods, when the government provided  in immediate assistance for flood relief.

On May 26, 2014, Fawcett was sworn in as Minister of Jobs, Skills, Training and Labour by Premier Dave Hancock and also continued as vice-chair of Treasury Board.

On September 15, 2014, Fawcett was sworn in as Minister of Environment and Sustainable Resource Development in the cabinet of Jim Prentice. He lost his seat in the May 5, 2015 provincial election that defeated Prentice's government.

Personal life

Fawcett is married to Ashley and they live in the Calgary community of Mount Pleasant.

Fawcett has a passion for sports. He has been an active member of his community, coaching youth baseball and football for 14 seasons. He has also mentored junior and senior high school students in northeast Calgary through the Alberta Mentorship Foundation for Youth program., and participated in the Impact Society's Heroes program. Every year since 2008, he has provided a scholarship to a first-year post-secondary student in his constituency.

In 2012, Fawcett was named as one of Avenue Magazine's (Calgary) Top 40 under 40. In 2002, he was also awarded a United Nations International Year of the Volunteer certificate by the Government of Canada for his commitment to improving our communities through volunteerism.

Election results

2015 General Election

2008 General Election

2012 general election

References

1979 births
Living people
Alberta school board trustees
Members of the Executive Council of Alberta
Politicians from Calgary
Progressive Conservative Association of Alberta MLAs
21st-century Canadian politicians